Lawan Musa Abdullahi also known as M. A. Lawan (born 25 March 1970) is a Nigerian lawyer and politician. He is the Attorney-General and commissioner for justice in Kano State. He is a former chairman of Nigerian Bar Association, Kano State branch.

Early life and background
Abdullahi was born in Fagge LGA, Kano State his is the son of Alhaji Musa Abdullahi. He started his primary school education at Festival Primary School and completed at Magwan Primary School when his family moved from Fagge to Tarauni LGA. He obtained his senior secondary school certificate at St. Thomas Secondary School before preceding to Bayero University Kano where he studied law and he was called to the Nigerian Bar in 2001.

Legal career
Abdullahi began his legal practice with S. H. Garun Gabas & Co in 2001. In 2006, he left the firm as head of the chamber to team up with Muhammad Umar & Co.. In 2010, he moved to establish his firm M. A. Lawn & Co.. In 2018, he was elected as the chairman of the Nigerian Bar Association, Kano State branch.

Political career
In 2019, he was appointed as commissioner for housing and transport by the governor of Kano State Abdullahi Umar Ganduje. In 2020, he was deployed to Ministry of Justice as to serve as the state's Attorney-General and commissioner for justice.

References 

1970 births
Living people
Bayero University Kano alumni
Politicians from Kano State
21st-century Nigerian lawyers
State attorneys general in Nigeria
21st-century Nigerian politicians